Alfred Ely (February 15, 1815 – May 18, 1892) was a U.S. Representative from New York. He was elected as a Republican to the Thirty-sixth and Thirty-seventh Congresses (March 4, 1859 – March 3, 1863), serving New York's 29th congressional district. Ely was captured by Confederate forces while spectating the First Battle of Bull Run.

Early life and political career
Born in Lyme, Connecticut, Ely attended the common schools and Bacon Academy at Colchester, Connecticut. He moved to Rochester, New York, in 1835. He studied law and was admitted to the bar in 1841. Ely commenced practice in Rochester.

Ely was elected as a Republican to the Thirty-sixth and Thirty-seventh Congresses (March 4, 1859 – March 3, 1863).  He served as chairman of the Committee on Invalid Pensions (Thirty-seventh Congress).  He was not a candidate for renomination in 1862.

Civil war
While witnessing the First Battle of Bull Run, Congressman Ely was taken a prisoner by the Confederates and imprisoned in Libby Prison of Richmond, Virginia; he was there for nearly six months along with many others. Among those captured was William H. Upham the future 18th Governor of Wisconsin who was a private in the Belle City Rifles of the 2nd Wisconsin Volunteer Infantry Regiment.

In December 1861, Ely was exchanged for Charles J. Faulkner, by the latter's own negotiations. At 5:00 AM on Christmas Day Ely was set free from Libby Prison. After Ely's release, D. Appleton & Company of New York published a journal of his experience in Libby Prison in 1862. Thereafter, he resumed the practice of law.  He died in Rochester, New York, May 18, 1892.  He was interred in the Ely vault in Mount Hope Cemetery.

See also

References

External links

1815 births
1892 deaths
American Civil War prisoners of war
Union Army officers
People of New York (state) in the American Civil War
New York (state) lawyers
People from Lyme, Connecticut
Republican Party members of the United States House of Representatives from New York (state)
19th-century American politicians
19th-century American lawyers
Bacon Academy alumni